Cahto (also spelled Kato) is an extinct Athabaskan language that was formerly spoken by the Kato people of the Laytonville and Branscomb area at the head of the South Fork of the Eel River. It is one of the four languages belonging to the California Athabaskan cluster of the Pacific Coast Athabaskan languages. Most Kato speakers were bilingual in Northern Pomo and some also spoke Yuki.

Phonology

Consonants

Cahto has 26 consonant phonemes and 30 phones.

Vowels

Cahto has 9 vowel phonemes (including the diphthong) and 12 phones.

References

 University of California Publications in American Archaeology and Ethnography 5(3):65-238.
 Goddard, Pliny Earle (1912). Elements of the Kato Language. University of California Publications in American Archaeology and Ethnography 11(1):1-176.

 Golla, Victor (2011). California Indian Languages. Berkeley: University of California Press. .

External links
 Kato language overview at the Survey of California and Other Indian Languages
 Kato Language (Cahto), nativelanguages.org
 The Cahto ("Kato") Language
 Experimental Cahto lexical database
 OLAC resources in and about the Kato language
 Kato Bibliography
 Kato basic lexicon at the Global Lexicostatistical Database

Pacific Coast Athabaskan languages
Extinct languages of North America
Languages of the United States
Languages extinct in the 1960s